Heteromicta alypeta is a species of snout moth in the genus Heteromicta. It was described by Turner in 1911, and is known from Queensland, Australia.

References

Moths described in 1911
Tirathabini